Monte Buio is a mountain in Liguria, northern Italy, part of the Ligurian Apennines.  It is located between the provinces of Genoa and Alessandria. It lies at an altitude of 1400 metres.

Toponymy 
Monte in Italian means Mount while Buio means Dark.

Geography 

The mountain has grassy slopes and on its summit stands a large cross. Is a tripoint where the valleys of Brevenna, Borbera and Vobbia meet. A brief ridge connects Monte Buio with monte Antola and the Ligurian Sea/Adriatic Sea water divide. The Monte Buio overlooks the Val Vobbia.

Access to the summit 

There are several hiking paths reaching the summit of Monte Buio, starting from Alpe and Vallenzona (two villages of the comune of Vobbia), from Tonno (Valbrevenna) and from the mountain passes of the Incisa and San Fermo.

The summit offers a good point of view on the nearby valleys and from it also the Ligurian Sea and a large stretch of the Western Alps can be seen.

Conservation 
The Ligurian side of the mountain since 1989 is included in the Parco naturale regionale dell'Antola<ref name = par2>Parco naturale regionael dell'Antola', pdf text on  www.altaviadeimontiliguri.it </ref> while the Piedmontese one is part of the Parco naturale dell'Alta val Borbera''.

References

Bibliography

External links 

 Hiking itinerary to Monte Buio

Mountains of Liguria
Mountains of Piedmont
One-thousanders of Italy
Mountains of the Apennines